Herb Bermann is an American lyricist, screenwriter, and actor. He is best known for co-writing the 1967 debut album Safe as Milk for Captain Beefheart and His Magic Band. The second album Strictly Personal featured four of Bermann's songs, however he was uncredited: "Safe As Milk", "Trust Us," "Gimme Dat Harp Boy," and "Kandy Korn"

A screenplay he co-wrote with Dean Stockwell became the inspiration for Neil Young's 1970 album After the Gold Rush.

A book featuring his known and previously unpublished lyrics, The Mystery Man from the Magic Band, was published in 2015 by Brass Tacks Press.

Selected works

Discography
 Safe as Milk (1967), Captain Beefheart and his Magic Band, Label: Buddah Records, Producers: Richard Perry and Bob Krasnow.
 Strictly Personal (1968) uncredited, Captain Beefheart and his Magic Band, Label: Blue Thumb, Producer: Bob Krasnow.

Films
 Malibu Song (2006), Director: Natalie Lettner and Werner Hanak, Producer: Eurotrash Productions.

Books
 The Mystery Man from the Magic Band: Captain Beefheart's Writing Partner Revealed (2015), Herb Bermann, Introduction by John French, Interview by Derek Laskie, Foreword by Alec Baldwin, Publisher: Brass Tacks Press.

Awards
 1971 Writers Guild of America Award (Outstanding Teleplay) – The Psychiatrist: Par for the Course, producer (Universal Studios/NBC), director Steven Spielberg.

References

External links
 

American lyricists
American screenwriters
21st-century American male actors
Captain Beefheart
Living people
Year of birth missing (living people)
The Magic Band members